Osredak (Cyrillic: Осредак) is a village in the municipality of Stanari (previously Doboj), Bosnia and Herzegovina.

References

Villages in Republika Srpska
Populated places in Doboj